Sales of music downloads in the United Kingdom have been monitored since 2004; during the 2000s, these sales were collated by the Official Charts Company and compiled weekly into the UK Official Download Chart, a record chart of the biggest-selling downloads in the UK.

In September 2009, The Daily Telegraph published a chart of what were the best-selling music downloads of the decade to that point. American singer Lady Gaga was number one with her 2009 single "Poker Face".

Several songs sold a significant amount in the final four months of the decade, after The Daily Telegraph list was published. These songs include "Bad Boys" by Alexandra Burke, "Fight for This Love" by Cheryl Cole, and "Killing in the Name" by Rage Against the Machine, which sold more than half a million copies in one week to become the 2009 Christmas number one.

Best-selling music downloads
:

References
General (chart positions)

Specific

External links
 Official Singles Downloads Chart at the Official Charts Company
 The Official UK Download Chart at MTV UK

2000s in British music
Lists of best-selling singles in the United Kingdom